Shimun X ( / Shemon, died  1638) was Patriarch of the Shemon line of primates of the Church of the East, from  1600 to  1638. He is claimed both by the Chaldean Catholic Church and the Assyrian Church of the East. Upon accession to the patriarchal throne, he moved his seat from Urmia to Salmas, and also resided in Khananis near Qodshanis. He succeeded Patriarch Shimun IX Dinkha who was in full communion with the Catholic Church. Unlike his predecessor, who was officially recognized by Rome as the Patriarch of the Chaldeans, Shimun X was not formally recognized by the Catholic Church because his election was based on hereditary principle, reintroduced after the death of his predecessor. Hereditary succession was considered an unacceptable practice by the Rome. In 1616, contacts between patriarch Shimun X and the Catholic Church were initiated, upon arrival of Catholic missionaries to the region. Patriarch composed a profession of faith, that was sent to Rome for assessment. Upon examination, Shimun′s profession was found inadequate, and he was not received into communion with the Catholic Church. Similar attempt was made in 1619, but wit no final conclusion. Because of such complex situation, his legacy was viewed differently along denominational lines, and claimed by both sides. He is considered as pro-Catholic by the Chaldean Catholic Church, and also as non-Catholic by the Assyrian Church of the East.

See also
 Patriarch of the Church of the East
 List of patriarchs of the Church of the East
 List of Chaldean Catholic patriarchs of Babylon

References

Sources

External links 

1638 deaths
Year of birth unknown
Chaldean Catholic Patriarchs of Babylon
17th-century Eastern Catholic archbishops
Patriarchs of the Church of the East
17th-century people from the Ottoman Empire
Bishops in the Ottoman Empire
Assyrians from the Ottoman Empire
17th-century people of Safavid Iran